Alicycliphilus is a genus in the phylum Pseudomonadota (Bacteria).

Etymology
The name Alicycliphilus derives from:Greek adjective , fat; Latin noun , circle or ring; New Latin pref. -, referring to circular fat-like organic compounds; New Latin adjective  from Greek adjective  meaning friend, loving; New Latin masculine gender adjective Alicycliphilus, alicyclic compound-liking, referring to the substrates used for the isolation of this organism.

Species
The genus contains a single species, namely A. denitrificans. The specific epithet denitrificans is a New Latin participle adjective meaning denitrifying.

See also
 Bacterial taxonomy
 Microbiology

References 

Bacteria genera
Comamonadaceae
Monotypic bacteria genera